Ferguson is a city in St. Louis County, Missouri, United States. It is part of the Greater St. Louis metropolitan area. Per the 2020 census, the population was 18,527.

History
What is now the city of Ferguson was founded in 1855, when William B. Ferguson deeded  of land to the Wabash Railroad in exchange for a new depot and naming rights. The settlement that sprang up around the depot was called Ferguson Station. Ferguson was the first railroad station connected directly to St. Louis. The station is a focal point of the city's history and is depicted on the city flag, designed in 1994.

Ferguson's first schoolhouse was built in 1878. Ferguson was incorporated as a city in 1894.

Emerson Electric moved its headquarters to Ferguson during the 20th century.

Until the 1960s, Ferguson was a sundown town where African Americans were not allowed to remain after nightfall.

Ferguson made frequent worldwide headlines for months following the 2014 killing of Michael Brown Jr. by a police officer and the ensuing civil unrest. The United States Department of Justice investigation which followed resulted in large legal fees for the town, in excess of $300,000 a year. The city now has a higher sales tax, utility gross receipts tax, and franchise tax for 2017/2018 to generate more revenue.

Ferguson elected its first black and first female mayor, Ella Jones, on June 2, 2020.

Demographics

The population of Ferguson grew rapidly during the late nineteenth century. In 1880 the population of the then Ferguson Station was 185 people.  By 1890 the population was recorded as being 750 and only four years later it had increased to 1200.

The population of Ferguson continued to grow rapidly during the first six decades of the twentieth century, from 1,015 people in 1900 to 22,149 people in 1960, an average growth rate of 5% per year. Since 1960 the population has remained nearly constant.

The ethnic composition of Ferguson has shifted, however. In 1970, 99% of the population of Ferguson was white and 1% black. In 1980, the proportion of white residents went down to 85%, whereas the proportion of black residents rose to 14%. In 1990, residents of Ferguson who were identified in the U.S. Census as white comprised 73.8% of the total, while those identified as black made up 25.1%. The remainder, 1.1%, identified with other racial categories. In the 2000 U.S. Census, 44.7% were white and 52.4% were African-American, now the majority ethnicity.

2020 census

Note: the US Census treats Hispanic/Latino as an ethnic category. This table excludes Latinos from the racial categories and assigns them to a separate category. Hispanics/Latinos can be of any race.

2010 Census
As of the 2010 U.S. Census, there were 21,203 people, 8,192 households, and 5,500 families residing in the city. The racial makeup of the city was 67.4% black, 29.3% white, 0.5% Asian, 0.4% Native American, 0.4% from other races, and 2.0% from two or more races. Hispanic and Latino of any race were 1.2% of the population.

There were 8,192 households, of which 39.1% had children under the age of 18 living with them, 29.6% were married couples living together, 31.5% had a female householder with no husband present, 6.1% had a male householder with no wife present, and 32.9% were non-families. 28.2% of all households were made up of individuals, and 7.4% had someone living alone who was 65 years of age or older. The average household size was 2.56 and the average family size was 3.12.

The median age in the city was 33.1 years. 28.7% of residents were under the age of 18; 10.4% were between the ages of 18 and 24; 25.2% were from 25 to 44; 25.3% were from 45 to 64; and 10.3% were 65 years of age or older. The gender makeup of the city was 44.8% male and 55.2% female.

Geography

Climate
Ferguson has a humid subtropical-continental climate. Winters are cold, while summers are hot and humid. The record high is 115 °F, and the record low is −19 °F.

Economy
The city is home to the headquarters of Emerson Electric.

Government

The Mayor of Ferguson is directly elected for a three-year term. The Ferguson
city council is composed of six members.

James Knowles III was elected mayor for a three-year term in April 2011 and ran unopposed in April 2014. Voter turnout in the April 2014 mayoral election was approximately 12%. In June 2020, Ella Jones (D) became the first African American and first woman to be elected mayor of Ferguson.

The Ferguson Police Department is involved with the following public programs: Business Watch, Community Emergency Response Team (CERT), D.A.R.E. Program, Neighborhood Watch, School Resource Officers, and Riot Patrol.

Ferguson also operates a two-station fire department with a complement of 18 full-time firefighters as well as nine senior management officials. The fire stations operate 24 hours a day.

Ferguson Police Department
On March 4, 2015, the Ferguson Police Department was criticized by the United States Department of Justice for civil rights violations. The Department of Justice argued that the Ferguson Police Department and the City of Ferguson relied on unconstitutional practices in order to balance the city's budget through racially motivated excessive fines and punishments.

On March 11, 2015, Ferguson Police Chief Thomas Jackson stated he was willing to resign, likely later that day (though no timeframe was confirmed) if he could get assurances that the Ferguson Police Department would be left in place and would not be dissolved; Fox News said he was not pushed out or fired. His resignation followed City Manager John Shaw who resigned March 10, and Municipal Judge Ronald Brockmeyer, who resigned March 9. Shaw had ultimate oversight over the Police Department and other city departments and was the most powerful civic official in Ferguson. He faced criticism for not doing enough to ameliorate the situation. The week before, three Ferguson Police Department employees were fired for offensive emails mentioned in the Justice Department report.

Michael Brown shooting

On August 9, 2014, an 18-year-old man, Michael Brown, was fatally shot by Darren Wilson with the Ferguson Police Department. The incident sparked riots and acts of vandalism in Ferguson as well as widespread calls for an investigation into the incident. On August 10, after a day of vigils, there were looting of businesses, arson, vandalism of vehicles, shots fired at firemen and violent clashes between rioters and police. On August 18, reservists from the Missouri National Guard arrived in Ferguson at the request of the Governor of Missouri Jay Nixon, who also ended midnight to 5:00 a.m. curfews that had been imposed. On November 24, a grand jury decided that it would not indict Wilson in the shooting death of Brown. Following the announcement of the grand jury's decision, there was more rioting.

Education
St. Louis Community College-Florissant Valley, which has about 8,000 students, is located in Ferguson.

Much of the community is within the Ferguson-Florissant School District (FFSD). Primary schools (grades K-2) serving sections of Ferguson include Central, Bermuda, Holman, and Walnut Grove. Intermediate schools (grade 3-5) serving sections of Ferguson include Lee-Hamilton, Griffith, and Berkeley. Zoned secondary schools with attendance boundaries that coincide with Ferguson include Johnson-Wabash 6th Grade Center, Ferguson Middle School, and McCluer High School. A portion of Ferguson is instead in the Riverview Gardens School District, and another is in the Hazelwood School District.

The following FFSD public schools are located within the city of Ferguson:
 STEAM Academy at McCluer South-Berkeley (a magnet school for grades 9-12), formerly McCluer South-Berkeley High School
 Ferguson Middle School (7-8)
 Johnson-Wabash 6th Grade Center (formerly Elementary School)
 Griffith Elementary School (3-5)
 Lee-Hamilton Elementary School (3-5)
 Central Elementary School (K-2)
Vogt Elementary School closed in 2019.

The following private schools are located within the city of Ferguson:
 Blessed Teresa of Calcutta School (Roman Catholic Archdiocese of St. Louis)
 Our Lady of Guadalupe School (Roman Catholic Archdiocese of St. Louis)
 Zion Lutheran School

Ferguson is also home to the Challenger Learning Center – St. Louis, which provides a space education program.

The Ferguson Municipal Public Library is one of several independent community libraries in St. Louis County and is a member of the Municipal Library Consortium of St. Louis County.

Notable people

This list may include persons born in the community, past residents, and current residents.
 General Ralph Eberhart, USAF, Commander of the North American Aerospace Defense Command during the September 11 attacks
 Michael McDonald, Grammy Award-winning singer
 Henry Miller, also known as Sentoryu, mixed martial artist and former sumo wrestler
 Delrish Moss, Miami law enforcement veteran sworn in on May 9, 2016 as the first permanent African-American Police Chief of Ferguson
 Susan Notorangelo, long-distance cyclist
 Enos Slaughter, Hall of Fame-winning St. Louis Cardinals baseball player
 Maury Travis, serial killer
 Harry Tuthill, cartoonist of the syndicated comic strip, The Bungle Family
 Tyron Woodley, American mixed martial artist, former UFC welterweight champion

See also

References

External links

 
 
 
Podcast: Ferguson’s Untold Tragedy of School Segregation—ProPublica (December 22, 2014)

 
Cities in St. Louis County, Missouri
Populated places established in 1855
Cities in Missouri
Sundown towns in Missouri
1855 establishments in Missouri